Gao Hong (born 27 November 1967) is a Chinese former footballer who played as a goalkeeper. She competed in the 1996 Summer Olympics and in the 2000 Summer Olympics. She also played professionally for the New York Power of the Women's United Soccer Association in 2001 and 2002.

In 1996 she won the silver medal with the Chinese team. She played all five matches as goalkeeper.

Four years later she was a member of the Chinese team which finished fifth in the women's tournament. She played all three matches as goalkeeper.

Hong played as goalkeeper for the Chinese team at the 1999 FIFA Women's World Cup.

She is known to stare down her opponents. Brandi Chastain recalled Hong's ability to psych her out. Chastain attributed Hong's ability to a lost goal, saying "She got in my head and as I approached the ball I was thinking more about her than about what I should be doing."

Hong began playing soccer at 18 when her supervisor at the factory she worked at made her join the factory's team. After her experience playing for her factory's team, she continued to play on a city team. Later, she began to compete professionally.

After the 1999 FIFA Women's World Cup, Hong left China to play for New York Power, an American professional soccer team in the Women's United Soccer Association. During her inaugural season for New York Power, Gao Hong recorded 87 saves with a 1.11 goals against average (GAA).

References

External links

profile

1967 births
Living people
Chinese women's footballers
Footballers at the 1996 Summer Olympics
Footballers at the 2000 Summer Olympics
Olympic footballers of China
Olympic silver medalists for China
Olympic medalists in football
Women's association football goalkeepers
Asian Games medalists in football
Footballers at the 1998 Asian Games
Medalists at the 1996 Summer Olympics
China women's international footballers
1995 FIFA Women's World Cup players
Asian Games gold medalists for China
Medalists at the 1998 Asian Games
New York Power players
Women's United Soccer Association players
Chinese expatriate footballers
Expatriate women's soccer players in the United States
Chinese expatriate sportspeople in the United States
1999 FIFA Women's World Cup players